Pico de Antónia is a mountain located in the central part of the island of Santiago in Cape Verde. At , it is the highest point of the island. The mountain is part of the protected area Parque Natural da Serra do Pico de Antónia. The towns Picos and Assomada lie close to the mountain. The Serra do Pico da Antónia has been identified by BirdLife International as an Important Bird Area. 

The mountain is at the tripoint of the municipalities of  São Salvador do Mundo, São Lourenço dos Órgãos and Ribeira Grande de Santiago. North of the summit is the source of the Ribeira de Pico da Antónia, a source river of the Ribeira Seca.

The Pico da Antónia formation is of volcanic origin, and was formed between 3.3 and 2.3 million years ago during the Piacenzian and the Gelasian periods.

References

Antonia
Geography of Santiago, Cape Verde
Santa Catarina, Cape Verde
São Salvador do Mundo, Cape Verde
Ribeira Grande de Santiago